Maldives first competed at the Asian Games in 1990.

Medal tables

Medals by Asian Games

References